Emiel Planckaert (born 22 October 1996 in Kortrijk) is a Belgian road cyclist, who currently rides for Belgian amateur team Decock–Van Eyck–Van Mossel Devos–Capoen. Planckaert retired from professional racing at the end of 2020 season, planning to continue to compete as an amateur. His brothers Baptiste Planckaert and Edward Planckaert are also professional cyclists.

Major results
2015
 5th Overall Course de la Solidarité Olympique
2016
 1st Grand Prix des Marbriers
2017
 7th Overall Ronde de l'Isard
 9th Overall Tour de Bretagne

References

External links

1996 births
Living people
Belgian male cyclists
Sportspeople from Kortrijk
Cyclists from West Flanders
21st-century Belgian people